Bertrand Bristol (born February 5, 1982) is a Seychellois former swimmer, who specialized in butterfly events. Bristol qualified for the men's 200 m butterfly at the 2004 Summer Olympics in Athens, by receiving a Universality place from FINA, in an entry time of 2:09.68. He challenged six other swimmers in heat one, including 15-year-old Sergey Pankov of Uzbekistan. He set a Seychellois record of 2:09.07 to edge out Pankov for a sixth spot by nearly four seconds. Bristol failed to advance into the semifinals, as he placed thirty-eighth overall in the preliminaries.

References

1982 births
Living people
Seychellois male swimmers
Olympic swimmers of Seychelles
Swimmers at the 2004 Summer Olympics
Commonwealth Games competitors for Seychelles
Swimmers at the 2002 Commonwealth Games
Swimmers at the 2006 Commonwealth Games
Male butterfly swimmers